Andrei Lvovich Gordeyev (born 1 April 1975) is a Russian professional football coach and a former player.

Playing career
As a player, he made his debut in the Russian Premier League in 1996 for FC Dynamo Moscow.

Coaching career
On 1 October 2019, he was appointed manager of third-tier PFL club Urozhay Krasnodar.

Honours
 Russian Premier League bronze: 1997.
 Russian Cup finalist: 1999 (played in the early stages of the 1998–99 tournament for FC Dynamo Moscow), 2001.

References

Footballers from Moscow
Russian footballers
FC Dynamo Moscow players
Russian Premier League players
FC Anzhi Makhachkala players
FC Fakel Voronezh players
Russian football managers
Russian Premier League managers
FC Saturn Ramenskoye managers
FC Metalurh Donetsk managers
FC Anzhi Makhachkala managers
Expatriate football managers in Ukraine
Russian expatriate sportspeople in Ukraine
1975 births
Living people
Ukrainian Premier League managers
Russian expatriate football managers
FC Sibir Novosibirsk managers
FC Mordovia Saransk managers
FC SKA-Khabarovsk managers
Association football defenders
FC Chertanovo Moscow players
FC FShM Torpedo Moscow players
FC Urozhay Krasnodar managers
FC Sportakademklub Moscow players